James William Barnes (14 August 1886 – 9 September 1963) was an English cricketer. Barnes' batting style is unknown, though it is known he bowled right-arm medium pace. He was born at Sutton-in-Ashfield, Nottinghamshire.

Career 
Barnes made his first-class debut for Nottinghamshire against the Gentlemen of Philadelphia in 1908 at Trent Bridge. The following season he made a single appearance in the County Championship against Essex, before making a third and final first-class appearance in the 1910 County Championship against Leicestershire. In his three first-class matches he scored a total of 19 runs with the bat at an average of 3.80 and a high score of 12. With the ball, he took 2 wickets at a bowling average of 52.50, with best figures of 1/30. He later coached cricket at Queen Elizabeth Grammar School, Mansfield.

His father Billy played Test cricket for England, while his uncle Thomas Barnes also played first-class cricket.

He died at Mansfield, Nottinghamshire on 9 September 1963.

References

External links

1886 births
1963 deaths
Cricketers from Sutton-in-Ashfield
English cricketers
Nottinghamshire cricketers
English cricket coaches